Telangana Janata Party (Telangana Peoples Party), a political party in the Indian state of Andhra Pradesh working for statehood for the Telangana region. TJP was launched in March 2004 by dissident Telangana Rashtra Samithi leader Muralidhar Rao Deshpande. Deshpande is the president of TJP.

TJP is affiliated to the Janata Party of Subramanian Swamy.

TJP joined the Telangana Rashtra Sadhana Front.

Political parties in Telangana
2004 establishments in Andhra Pradesh
Political parties established in 2004